Steve Bowman (born January 14, 1967) is an American rock drummer and songwriter.  He was a founding member and drummer for Counting Crows during the recording and period of time following their debut album, August and Everything After. The band's unexpected success led them to performances  on Late Night with David Letterman, and Saturday Night Live. They toured with The Rolling Stones, were nominated for two Grammy Awards, and won an American Music Award.  By 1994, they were also on the cover of Rolling Stone magazine.

Bowman left the band in late 1994.  In the next few years, he went on to play with Third Eye Blind, John Wesley Harding, and Penelope Houston.  In 1998, Bowman and his new band Luce recorded the song "Good Day", which was featured in the films How to Lose a Guy in 10 Days and 13 Going On 30.  Bowman also played on Luce's second 
record which produced the hit single, "Buy a Dog."

Bowman is active as a session musician, has released a book on drumming called Groove Control, contributes freelance articles to various music magazines, and runs a private teaching studio just outside Nashville called Murfreesboro Music Lab.

References

External links
 

Living people
1967 births
American male bloggers
American bloggers
American rock drummers
Songwriters from Tennessee
Counting Crows members
Place of birth missing (living people)
American session musicians
Musicians from Tennessee
People from Nashville, Tennessee
20th-century American drummers
American male drummers